Huhtasuo is a ward of Jyväskylä, Finland. It contains the Huhtasuo and Kangasvuori districts. The area was mostly built during the 1970s. The population of Huhtasuo was 9 373 in 2016.

Gallery

Notable people 

 Matti Nykänen, ski jumper
 Raimo Summanen, ice hockey player and coach
Tarmo Uusivirta, boxer

References 

Neighbourhoods of Jyväskylä